Merlin Publishing Limited, commonly known as Merlin and sometimes branded as Merlin Collections was a British publishing firm who released a variety of sticker collections during the late 1980s and 1990s, they also designed trading cards, card games and pogs. Although most notably releasing football stickers in particularly for the Premier League and Serie A, they also designed collections around television shows and other points of interest.

In 1993 the company became known as Merlin Publishing International PLC before being bought out by Topps in 1995. They were absorbed into the company, being renamed Topps Europe Limited, although the name Merlin would continue as a brand under the Topps name initially until 2008. In 2014 the Merlin brand returned to the Premier League sticker collections until Panini was awarded the contract in 2019. Today the Merlin brand is used by Topps as a retro range designed around its UEFA Champions League trading cards.

History

Merlin Publishing Ltd was founded in 1989 by Robert and John Warsop and Robert Windmill. They had previously worked for Panini Group, but decided to leave after Panini were acquired by Robert Maxwell. Merlin grew very quickly to become a major player in the European market for collectable stickers and cards. It became public by 1993 as Merlin Publishing International PLC. By 1995, the company's progress was such that it won the prestigious Price Waterhouse/Independent on Sunday award for the fastest growing privately held British company.

The company's official Premier League football collection launched in 1994 and has become, annually, the world's best selling sticker collection, the Merlin name would continue on the official collection until 2008 where it was rebranded as Topps before Panini won the contract in 2020. Merlin reached the old Panini levels, shifting 76m packets in the Premier League's early years, while Panini's last British domestic album dived to sales of no more than three to four million packets, in 1990. The company's official Premier League football collection launched in 1994 and has become, annually, the world's best selling sticker collection, the Merlin name would continue on the official collection until 2008 where it was rebranded as Topps before Panini won the contract in 2020.

In this period, as well as producing BattleCards in 1993, the company produced other best selling sticker and card collections including The Magic of Beano, Nintendo, World Wrestling Entertainment Superstars, Gladiators, Street Fighter II, Jurassic Park, Batman, and Power Rangers.

In 1995, the Topps Company Inc. completed its takeover of Merlin Publishing. Merlin's official company name changed to Topps Europe Limited, but its products still carried the Merlin brand until 2008 as it was easily recognized by consumers.

In 2014 Topps announced it would once again it would use the Merlin brand for its 2015 Premier League sticker collection.

Products

Merlin's Premier League stickers

The Premier League was founded in 1992, but the only sticker album to feature the 1992–93 season was Panini's "Football 93" that wasn't an official product. In 1993 the Premier League chief executive David Dein approached Merlin about producing an album for the 1993–94 season, with Dein approaching Merlin because of his friendship with director Patricia Kluge.

Merlin's Premier League 94 was the debut collection with Manchester United's Ryan Giggs and Arsenal's Paul Merson chosen as the players featured on the album cover. The album consisted of 479 stickers across 80 pages, featuring all twenty-two teams, each having 15 player stickers, a shiny glitter backed club crest, a team photo, shiny club jersey sticker and matchday programme sticker. The foreword was written by Sky Sports co-commentator Andy Gray. Other notable stickers include the "Number 1" which was the Premier League logo, the trophy and the Sky Sports logo. Merlin struggled to meet demand of reprints such was the popularity and demand.

In 1995 following the companies take over by Topps, The Merlin 95 collection included 3D stickers and inserted 3D glasses, stickers were also promoted by Kellogg's in Corn Flakes with free packets of stickers given away. They also released "Magicaps" a form of pogs consisting of 264 caps featuring some of the players and logos featured in the sticker collection.

McDonald's became a feature of Merlin's 96 collection with specialised stickers in the central page sections, these franchise stickers were also featured in the 97 and 98 collections. The 96 collection also featured a promotion by Nestle Shreddies who also gave out free packets with their cereal.

The Merlin brand on the Premier League collections would run until 2008, when the collection was finally branded "Topps Premier League", this lasted until 2014 when the name Merlin was re-introduced as a brand.

In 2019, Topps would lose the Premier League contract for the first time with Panini winning the rights to take over the series for the impending 2019–20 season, thus ending the series.

Games
BattleCards featured a unique "Scratch and Slay" system created by Steve Jackson. The cards came in 10 card booster packs which included warrior cards, spell cards, advanced combat cards, quest cards, and treasure cards. The game was published in both the UK and the United States with a number of differences between the two releases. debuted at Gen Con 1993 (exactly same time as Magic: The Gathering saw public release) and was marketed as a trading card game.

On rare occasions, it is debated whether the game counts as the world's first CCG along with Magic. However, the game is not played with a deck and there is no collectibility involved. The Scrye guide acknowledges the limited playability of the game as "use them once and they're worthless" which strictly disqualifies it as a collectible card game. Darwin Bromley of Mayfair Games noted that the scratch-offs would crack when shuffled, and once scratched off "you had to either play the game or collect it." "You couldn't have your cake and eat it too."

In 1997 the company released a marbles game based on their Premier League 97 sticker collection, coined "Flick-A-Balls", with a collection number of 240, each marble contained the image of one of the football players from the sticker collection, the collection was not repeated in 1998.

In popular culture
In 2021, the "Searching for Shineys" podcast launched in which the presenters attempted to track down and interview players who featured in Merlin's Premier League 97 sticker album. The podcast ran for 20 episodes over two seasons.

Legacy
Merlin's Premier League stickers have become a synonymous with British culture of the 90's, along with Panini's collections they are widely recognised amongst British football fans as a past time mainly collected by children and swapped about in school playgrounds. The "Number 1" sticker (usually the Premier League badge) was often depicted as the most sacred sticker to collect, other childhood habits included dealing in such a way that a shiny sticker was worth the value of several normal stickers.

In 2013, a man from Portsmouth found his old 'Premier League 96' album in his attic and realised he hadn't completed it like he thought. He then set off on a mission to locate the remaining six players to take his own photograph of them to stick in his book. It took him six months to locate and travel and visit each player they were Keith Curle, Stuart Ripley, Scott Minto, Gary Penrice, Lars Bohinen and Philippe Albert. He later wrote a book about the experience.

In 2020, Topps released "Merlin Heritage 95" card collection for the seasons UEFA Champions League collection, the packaging and card design was based on the same design as the 'Merlin Premier League 95' collection. In 2021, Topps announced their UCL cards for the 2021–22 season would be named "Merlin Heritage 97" and would be released using the same template designs used in from "Merlin's Premier League 97"

Collections

Football
Football sticker and card collections released by Merlin Publishing or later by Topps using the Merlin brand.

Other Sports
Other sports sticker and card collections released by Merlin Publishing or later by Topps using the Merlin brand.

Film and Television
Film and Television sticker and card collections released by Merlin Publishing or later by Topps using the Merlin brand.

Other Collections
Film and Television sticker and card collections released by Merlin Publishing or later by Topps using the Merlin brand.

Games
Card released by Merlin Publishing or later by Topps using the Merlin brand.

Pogs
Pogs released by Merlin Publishing or later by Topps using the Merlin brand.

See also

 Association football trading card
 Sticker album

References

External links 

 Official website

1995 mergers and acquisitions
Publishing companies established in 1989
Publishing companies disestablished in 1995
Association football culture
British brands
Trading cards
Trading card companies
British companies established in 1989
British companies disestablished in 1995
Sports memorabilia
Topps
Companies based in Milton Keynes